"What You're Made Of" is a 2020 single written and performed by violinist Lindsey Stirling featuring guest vocals from Kiesza.

Background
"What You're Made Of" was written by Stirling, alongside RuthAnne, Wendy Wang and producer Gladius for the second anniversary for Global or English version of mobile video game Azur Lane. 

Stirling wrote the song at an all female SheWrites writing camp.  Speaking about the song in the official press release, she said:

Kiesza was brought onto the project for guest lyrics.  She would later join Stirling's Artemis World Tour as a guest performer.

Music video
An official lyric video was released along with the song on August 13, 2020.

References

2020 singles
2020 songs
Lindsey Stirling songs
Kiesza_songs
Songs written by Lindsey Stirling
Songs written by RuthAnne